Folylpolyglutamate synthase, mitochondrial is an enzyme that in humans is encoded by the FPGS gene.

This gene encodes the folylpolyglutamate synthetase enzyme. This enzyme has a central role in establishing and maintaining both cytosolic and mitochondrial folylpolyglutamate concentrations and, therefore, is essential for folate homeostasis and the survival of proliferating cells. This enzyme catalyzes the ATP-dependent addition of glutamate moieties to folate and folate derivatives. While several transcript variants may exist for this gene, the full-length natures of only two have been biologically validated to date. These two variants encode distinct isoforms.

Interactive pathway map

References

Further reading